Maurício de Sousa Produções (MSP, Mauricio de Sousa Productions), or Estúdios Mauricio de Sousa (Maurício de Sousa Studios), is the company responsible for the production of comics and cartoons, the creation and development of characters, product licensing, and all other projects related to the characters created by Mauricio de Sousa.

History
Founded by Brazilian cartoonist Mauricio de Sousa, it was originally dedicated to the production of comic strips published in the newspapers in the late 1960s and early 1970s, Mauricio started a partnership for the publication of magazines with Editora Abril, which lasted until the mid-1980s when, to increase circulation, changed to Editora Globo.

During this same period he produced some animated feature films, an initiative that did not provide the desired return, as Mauricio himself assured. Also, the production of small short films, for TV, did not go forward.

On January 1, 2007, Mauricio de Sousa Produções (a name that encompasses all of the author's editorial initiatives) left Globo, signing an "exclusive and long-lasting" agreement with Panini Comics. The primary objective of this new change is the pretension of reaching foreign markets.

Already when he was working at Editora Abril, Maurício tried to invest his characters in other countries. This had a bigger expansion during the partnership with Globo, but its products did not obtain great success outside Brazil – something that intends to get around, with the new partnership. Currently, Mauricio de Sousa Studio works with Mauricio's newest release: the manga Monica Teen – which, however, was expected to sell a maximum of 60,000 copies in its first edition but due to its great success sold more than 230,000 copies. Mauricio de Sousa Produções changed its address on January 25, 2017.

References

External links 
 

 
Companies based in São Paulo
Mass media companies established in 1959
Comic book publishing companies of Brazil
1959 establishments in Brazil